Studio Sessions New York & Chicago, 1965, 1966 & 1971 is the tenth volume of The Private Collection—a series documenting recordings made by American pianist, composer and bandleader Duke Ellington for his personal collection which was first released on the LMR label in 1987 and later on the Saja label.

Reception
The Allmusic review by Stewart Mason awarded the album 4 stars stating the album features "dazzling rhythmic shifts highlighting the orchestra's uncanny musical synchronicity".

Track listing
:All compositions by Duke Ellington
 "Black" - 8:09  
 "Come Sunday" - 5:59  
 "Light" - 6:29  
 "West Indian Dance" - 2:15  
 "Emancipation Celebration" - 2:36  
 "The Blues" - 5:23  
 "Cy Runs Rock Waltz" - 2:18  
 "Beige" - 2:24  
 "Sugar Hill Penthouse" - 4:55  
 "Harlem" - 13:42  
 "Ad Lib on Nippon" - 11:40
Recorded at Fine Studios, New York on March 4, 1965 (tracks 1-3 & 11) at Universal Studios, Chicago on March 31, 1965 (tracks 4 & 5) and May 18, 1965 (tracks 7-9),  at RCA Studio A on August 18, 1966 (track 10) and at National Recording Studio, New York on May 5, 1971 (track 6).

Personnel
Duke Ellington – piano
Ray Nance -cornet (tracks 1-5 & 7-11)
Cat Anderson (tracks 1-5 & 7-11), Mercer Ellington (track 6), Money Johnson (track 6), Herb Jones (tracks 1-5 & 7-11), Eddie Preston (track 6), Cootie Williams - trumpet 
Lawrence Brown (tracks 1-5 & 7-11), Buster Cooper (tracks 1-5 & 7-11), Malcolm Taylor (track 6), Booty Wood (track 6) - trombone
Chuck Connors - bass trombone 
Jimmy Hamilton - clarinet, tenor saxophone (tracks 1-5 & 7-11)
Russell Procope - alto saxophone, clarinet (tracks 1-5 & 7-11)
Johnny Hodges (tracks 1-5 & 7-11), Buddy Pearson (track 6), Norris Turney (track 6) - alto saxophone 
Paul Gonsalves - tenor saxophone
Harry Carney - baritone saxophone 
John Lamb (track 1-5 & 7-11), Joe Benjamin (track 6)- bass
Rufus Jones (track 6), Sam Woodyard (tracks 1-5 & 7-11) - drums

References

Saja Records albums
Duke Ellington albums
1987 albums